William Tripp Woolsey (September 13, 1934 – June 25, 2022) was an American competition swimmer and Olympic champion.  He represented the United States at the 1952 Summer Olympics in Helsinki, Finland, where he won a gold medal in the men's 4×200-meter freestyle relay with Wayne Moore, Ford Konno and Jimmy McLane.  Four years later at the 1956 Summer Olympics in Melbourne, Australia, he won a silver medal in the 4×200-meter freestyle relay with Dick Hanley, George Breen and Ford Konno.

Woolsey attended Indiana University, and swam for coach Doc Counsilman's Indiana Hoosiers swimming and diving team in National Collegiate Athletic Association (NCAA) competition.

Woolsey died in California on June 25, 2022, at the age of 87.

See also
 List of Indiana University (Bloomington) people
 List of Olympic medalists in swimming (men)

References

External links
 

1934 births
2022 deaths
American male freestyle swimmers
Indiana Hoosiers men's swimmers
Olympic gold medalists for the United States in swimming
Pan American Games bronze medalists for the United States
Swimmers from Honolulu
Swimmers at the 1952 Summer Olympics
Swimmers at the 1956 Summer Olympics
Swimmers at the 1959 Pan American Games
Medalists at the 1956 Summer Olympics
Medalists at the 1952 Summer Olympics
Olympic silver medalists for the United States in swimming
Pan American Games medalists in swimming
Medalists at the 1959 Pan American Games